Adrian Phillips (born March 28, 1992) is an American football safety for the New England Patriots of the National Football League (NFL). He played college football at Texas and joined the San Diego Chargers as an undrafted free agent in 2014. During the 2018 season, he earned Pro Bowl and first-team All-Pro honors. Phillips joined the Patriots in 2020.

Early years
Phillips played high school football at Garland High School in Garland, Texas. Phillips was an all-state, all-area and two-time first-team all-district selection while playing offense and defense for the Owls. He was a member of ESPNU's top 150 national prospects, ranked as the 14th-best athlete by ESPNU and 25th-best athlete by Rivals. He recorded 72 receptions for 1,307 yards and 14 TDs, 1,111 rushing yards, 14 rushing TDs, 949 passing yards, five passing touchdowns, 87 tackles, a forced fumble, and three interceptions.

College career
Phillips played for the Texas Longhorns from 2010 to 2013. He played in 50 games, starting 28. He was a 2013 honorable mention All-Big 12 coaches choice. Phillips had 206 career tackles and was a team captain in the 2013 season.

Professional career

San Diego / Los Angeles Chargers

2014 season
On June 16, 2014, the San Diego Chargers signed Phillips after he went undrafted in the 2014 NFL Draft. On August 31, 2014, the San Diego Chargers waived Phillips. After clearing waivers, he was signed to their practice squad. On September 23, 2014, Phillips was waived from the Chargers' practice squad. On September 29, 2014, the San Diego Chargers' re-signed Phillips to their practice squad. On October 1, 2014, Phillips was released from the Chargers' practice squad, but he was re-signed to the practice squad on October 7, 2014. On November 1, 2014, the San Diego Chargers promoted Phillips to the active roster. On November 2, 2014, Phillips made his professional regular season debut and recorded one tackle during a 37-0 loss at the Miami Dolphins in Week 9. On November 3, 2014, the San Diego Chargers released Phillips, but re-signed him to their practice squad the following day. On November 29, 2014, the San Diego Chargers released Phillips and re-signed him to their practice squad on December 2, 2014. He finished his rookie campaign with one tackle and appeared in three games.

2015 season
Phillips entered training camp slated as a backup safety and competed for a roster spot against Gordon Hill and Johnny Lowdermilk. On September 5, 2015, the San Diego Chargers released Phillips, but subsequently signed him to their practice squad the following day. On October 12, 2015, the San Diego Chargers released Phillips from their practice squad. On October 14, 2015, the Chargers re-signed him to their practice squad. On October 20, 2015, the San Diego Chargers signed him to their active roster.

2016 season
Throughout training camp, Phillips competed for roster spot as a backup safety against Dexter McCoil, Darrell Stuckey, and Adrian MacDonald. Head coach Mike McCoy named Phillips the backup strong safety to begin the regular season, behind Jahleel Addae.

Phillips was inactive as a healthy scratch for the first two games (Weeks 1-2). On October 2, 2016, Phillips recorded three combined tackles, a pass deflection, and made his first career interception during a 35-34 loss against the New Orleans Saints. Phillips intercepted a pass attempt by Drew Brees, that was originally intended for wide receiver Michael Thomas, during the fourth quarter. In Week 10, Phillips recorded a season-high seven combined tackles (six solo) during a 31-24 loss against the Miami Dolphins. He finished the 2016 NFL season 38 combined tackles (25 solo), three pass deflections, and one interception in 14 games and five starts.

2017 season
On September 11, 2017, in the season opener against the Denver Broncos on Monday Night Football, Phillips had an interception off of quarterback Trevor Siemian that helped set up a scoring drive for the Chargers. He played in 15 games with four starts as the No. 3 safety behind Jahleel Addae and Tre Boston.

2018 season
On March 14, 2018, Phillips re-signed with the Chargers. He played in 16 games with seven starts, recording a career-high 94 combined tackles, nine passes defensed, one interception, and a forced fumble. He was named to his first Pro Bowl and was named first-team All-Pro, both as a special teamer.

2019 season
On March 15, 2019, Phillips re-signed with the Chargers. He entered the season as a starting safety following an injury to Derwin James. He suffered a broken arm in Week 2 and was placed on injured reserve on September 17, 2019. He was designated for return from injured reserve on November 14, 2019, and began practicing with the team again. He was activated on November 30.

New England Patriots
On March 21, 2020, the New England Patriots signed Phillips to a two-year, $6 million contract that includes $3 million guaranteed and a signing bonus of $1.50 million.

Phillips made his debut with the Patriots in Week 1 against the Miami Dolphins.  During the game, Phillips intercepted a pass thrown by Ryan Fitzpatrick in the 21–11 win.
In Week 15 against the Miami Dolphins, Phillips recorded his first career sack on Tua Tagovailoa during the 22–12 loss.

In Week 8 of the 2021 season, Phillips had three tackles and two interceptions, including a 26-yard pick-six, in a 27-24 win over his former team, the Chargers, earning AFC Defensive Player of the Week. On January 1, 2022, Phillips signed a three-year contract extension with the Patriots.

References

External links
NFL Draft Scout

Living people
1992 births
African-American players of American football
American football defensive backs
Garland High School alumni
Los Angeles Chargers players
New England Patriots players
People from Garland, Texas
Players of American football from Texas
San Diego Chargers players
Sportspeople from the Dallas–Fort Worth metroplex
Texas Longhorns football players
21st-century African-American sportspeople
American Conference Pro Bowl players